The 1964–65 Toronto Maple Leafs season was Toronto's 48th season in the National Hockey League (NHL).

Offseason

Regular season

Final standings

Record vs. opponents

Schedule and results

Playoffs

Player statistics

Regular season
Scoring

Goaltending

Playoffs
Scoring

Goaltending

Awards and records

Transactions
The Maple Leafs were involved in the following transactions during the 1964–65 season.

Trades

Inter-League Draft

Reverse Draft

Free agents

Draft picks
Toronto's draft picks at the 1964 NHL Entry Draft held at the Queen Elizabeth Hotel in Montreal, Quebec.

Farm teams

See also
 1964–65 NHL season

References

External links

Toronto Maple Leafs season, 1964-65
Toronto Maple Leafs seasons
Tor